Hertzler is a surname. Notable people with the surname include:

J. G. Hertzler (born 1949), American actor
Terry Hertzler (born 1949), American poet and writer

See also
Hartzler